In the cultures of the Horn of Africa and adjacent regions of the Middle East,  Zār is the term for a demon or spirit assumed to possess  individuals, mostly women, and to cause discomfort or illness.
The so-called zār ritual or zār cult is the practice of exorcising such spirits from the possessed individual.

Zār exorcism has become popular in the contemporary urban culture of Cairo and other major cities of the Islamic world as a form of women-only entertainment. Zār gatherings involve food and musical performances and they culminate in ecstatic dancing, lasting between three and seven nights. 
The tanbūra, a six-string bowl lyre, is often used in the ritual. Other instruments include the manjur, a leather belt sewn with many goat hooves, and various percussion instruments.

History
Scholarship in the early 20th century attributed Abyssinian (Ethiopian and Eritrean) origin to the custom, although there
were also proposals suggesting Persian or other origins.
Thus, Frobenius suggested that  zār and bori, a comparable cult in Hausa culture, were ultimately derived from a Persian source. Modarressi (1986) suggests a Persian etymology for the term.

The origin of the word is unclear; Walker (1935) suggested the name of the city of Zara in northern Iran, or alternatively the Arabic root z-w-r "to visit" (for the possessing spirit "visiting" the victim). The Encyclopedia of Islam of 1934 favoured an Ethiopian origin of the word.

The practice allegedly originated in Harar, Ethiopia via Sheikh Abadir, it was introduced by Harari and Somali women to Aden in Yemen. Messing (1958) states that the cult was particularly well-developed in Northern Ethiopia (Amhara), with its center in the town of Gondar.
One late 19th-century traveler describes the Abyssinian "Sár" cultists sacrificing a hen or goat and mixing the blood with grease and butter, in the hopes of eliminating someone's sickness.  The concoction was then hidden in an alley, in the belief that all who passed through the alley would take away the patient's ailment.

Mirzai Asl (2002) suggests that the introduction to  Iran likewise took place in the 19th century (Qajar period) by Africans brought to Iran via the Indian ocean slave trade. 
Natvig (1988) reports that the zār cult "served as a refuge for women and effeminate men" in the Sahel (Sudan) region under Islamic rule.

Varieties 
Among extant varieties of Zār cults are "zār Sawāknī (the zār from the area of Suakin ["Dalūka, that is, zār Sawāknī"]) and zār Nyamānyam (the zār of the Azande)": "the Nyam-Nyam have zār nugāra, with Babīnga and Nakūrma". "Babīnga and Nakūrma are recognized as Azande ancestral spirits". Nugāra (big drum) = "nuqara ... of the Dega tribe ... was originally from Wau". "Besides the nugāra of the Azande, other zār cults mentioned were those of the Fartīt [Fartīt peoples include "the Karra, Gula, Feroge, and Surro"], the Shilluk people, and the Dinka people and the dinia Nuba cult".

Spirits
In Ethiopia, zār is used as a term for malevolent spirits or demons.   At the same time, many Ethiopians believe in benevolent, protective spirits, or adbar.

Belief in such spirits is widespread among both Christians and Muslims.
Ĥēṭ ("thread") is a term of for the possessing spirits. Tumbura  is another term. Named individual tumbura include: Nuba, Banda, Gumuz, Sawākiniyya, Lambūnāt, Bābūrāt, Bāshawāt, Khawājāt. Depending on which spirit an individual is possessed by, they will don different costumes, such a traditional loincloth for Nuba, a straw loincloth for Bada, 
a red fez for Bāśawāt, and a pith-helmet and khaki shorts for Ĥawājāt.

According to legend, there are eighty-eight "Sároch", emissaries of evil all under the service of a spirit named "Warobal Mama", who dwells in lake Alobar in the Menz region.

Zār beliefs are common today even among Ethiopian immigrants to North America, Europe, or Israel. For example, Beta Israel are often raised with both Jewish and Zār beliefs, and individuals who believe they house a spirit are bound to attend to it despite other demands. However, ceremonies can be performed by shamans to persuade a spirit to leave, thus releasing the person from their duties to that spirit.

In southern Iran, zār is interpreted as a "harmful wind" assumed to cause discomfort or illness. Types of such winds include Maturi, Šayḵ Šangar, Dingemāru, Omagāre, Bumaryom, Pepe, Bābur, Bibi,  Namrud. The film The African-Baluchi Trance Dance is a 2012 film that depicts a variety of zar-related activities in southeastern Iran.

See also
 Buda (folk religion)
 Fann at-Tanbura
 Mazaher

References

General references
Lewis, I. (Ioan)  M.  1991.  Zar in context: The past, the present and future of an African healing cult.  In I. M. Lewis, A. Al-Safi, & S. Hurreiz (Eds.), Women's medicine: The Zar Bori cult in Africa and Beyond (pp. 1–16).  Edinburgh, U.K.:  Edinburgh University Press.

Further reading

Ethiopia

Aspen, Harald. Amhara Traditions of Knowledge: Spirit Mediums and Their Clients. Wiesbaden, Germany: Harrassowitz Verlag, 2001.

Kahana, Y.  1985.  The zar spirits, a category of magic in the system of mental health care in Ethiopia.  The International Journal of Social Psychiatry, 31.2:125-143.

Messing, Simon.  1958.  Group therapy and social status in the Zar cult of Ethiopia.  American Anthropologist 60:1120-1126.  (Same title later published in Culture and Mental Health, M. Opler, ed., 319-322.  New York: Macmillan, also in 1972, in The Target of Health in Ethiopia, 228-241.  New York: MSS Information Corporation.) 

Tubiana, Joseph.  1991.  Zar and Buda in Northern Ethiopia.  In I. M. Lewis, A. Al-Safi, & S. Hurreiz (Eds.),  Women's medicine: The Zar Bori cult in Africa and beyond pp. 19–33.  Edinburgh, UK:  Edinburgh University Press.

Sudan
Boddy, Janice. Wombs and Alien Spirits: Women, Men and the Zar Cult in Northern Sudan University of Wisconsin Press (30 November 1989)
Kapteijns, Lidwien and Jay Spaulding.  1994. "Women of the Zar and Middle-Class Sensibilities in Colonial Aden, 1923-1932," Sudanic Africa 5, pp. 7–38.  Also in 1996, Voice and Power, (African Languages and Cultures, supplement 3), ed. by R.J. Hayward and I. M. Lewis, 171-189.
 Makris, G.P. (2000). Changing Masters: Spirit Possession and Identity Construction among Slave Descendants and Other Subordinates in the Sudan. Evanston, IL: Northwestern U. 
 Farah Eisa Mohamed. 2004. "ZAR: SPIRIT POSSESSION IN THE SUDAN." African Folklore: An Encyclopedia, Philip M.Peek and Kwesi Yankah, editors, 1061-1063. New York & London: Routledge.

Egypt
Fakhouri, Hani. "The Zar Cult in an Egyptian Village." Anthropological Quarterly, vol. 41, no. 2 (April 1968), pp. 49–56.
Seligmann, Brenda Z. "On the Origin of the Egyptian Zar." Folklore, vol. 25, no. 3 (September 30, 1914), pp. 300–323.

Somalia

Iran
Modarressi, Taghi. 1968. The zar cult in south Iran. In Trance and possession states. ed. Raymond Prince. Montreal: R. M. Bucke Memorial Society.

Further reading 
El Hadidi, Hager. Zar: Spirit Possession, Music, and Healing Rituals in Egypt. The American University in Cairo Press: Cairo, New York, 2016.

External links
The zar and the tumbura cults
Changing_Masters (Ṭumbura in Sudan), part I 
Changing_Masters (Ṭumbura in Sudan), parts II-III

Zar from the island of Qeshm in the Persian Gulf,recorded in Tehran by Neil van der Linden.

African demons
Exorcism
Religion in Djibouti
Religion in Egypt
Religion in Eritrea
Religion in Ethiopia
Religion in Iran
Religion in Somalia
Religion in Sudan
Spirit possession
Jinn